Vallons-de-l'Erdre is a commune in the department of Loire-Atlantique, western France. The municipality was established on 1 January 2018 by merger of the former communes of Saint-Mars-la-Jaille (the seat), Bonnœuvre, Freigné (part of the department of Maine-et-Loire before 2018), Maumusson, Saint-Sulpice-des-Landes and Vritz.

Population

See also 
Communes of the Loire-Atlantique department

References 

Communes of Loire-Atlantique
Populated places established in 2018
2018 establishments in France